Trigonopoma gracile is a species of cyprinid fish found in Indonesia and Malaysia.

Description 
Differs from all of its congeners by the following combination of characters: lateral line incomplete to absent, perforating 0-6 scales; 29-32 scales along normal course of lateral line; a conspicuous black (bluish black in life) lateral stripe from tip of snout to extremity of median caudal rays; body slender, its depth 4.4-4.8 times in SL (4.0-5.1); caudal peduncle slender than all other Rasbora, its depth 2.3-2.8 times in its length (2.3-3.3); and long and pointed dorsal and anal fins.

References 

Fish of Thailand
Trigonopoma
Fish of Asia
Freshwater fish of Indonesia
Freshwater fish of Malaysia
Fish described in 1991